Satélite Norte FC is a Bolivian football club based in Warnes which currently plays in the Copa Simón Bolívar, the second tier competition in the country. The club plays its home matches at the 10,000-seat Estadio Samuel Vaca Jimenez. The current manager is Juan Carlos Farah.

Players and staff

Roster

References

External links
Official Facebook
Soccerway profile

Football clubs in Bolivia